Sara Crawford Maschal was an American politician who was elected to the Connecticut House of Representatives in 1938 as a Republican.

Personal life 
Maschal was the second child of John and Sara Crawford. The younger Sara was known as Sally and married Webster Maschal. She and her sisters Janet and Susan all attended Connecticut College, with Maschal graduating in 1925.

Political career 
Maschal was a member of the Republican Party. Upon winning election in 1938, Maschal became the first woman to represent Norwalk in the Connecticut House of Representatives. Maschal and her mother were the first mother and daughter to have both served in the Connecticut General Assembly.

By 1967, Maschal and her husband moved to Laguna Hills, California. Maschal passed away in 1983.

References

Year of birth missing
Date of death missing
20th-century American politicians
Connecticut College alumni
Women state legislators in Connecticut
Politicians from Norwalk, Connecticut
Connecticut Republicans
1983 deaths
20th-century American women politicians